Marios Poutziouris (born 8 December 1993) is a Cypriot footballer who plays as a central midfielder for Othellos Athienou.

Career
On 17 August 2019, Poutziouris returned to Othellos Athienou.

Honours 
Cypriot Super Cup: 2014

References

External links 

Living people
1993 births
Cypriot footballers
Cyprus under-21 international footballers
Ermis Aradippou FC players
Othellos Athienou F.C. players
Ethnikos Achna FC players
Doxa Katokopias FC players
Cypriot First Division players
Association football midfielders